The 1985 World Junior Ice Hockey Championships (1985 WJHC) was the ninth edition of the Ice Hockey World Junior Championship and was held mainly in Turku and Helsinki, Finland.  Canada won the gold medal, its second championship,  Czechoslovakia silver and the Soviet Union bronze.

Final standings
The 1985 tournament was a round-robin format, with the top three teams winning gold, silver and bronze medals respectively.

Poland was relegated to Pool B for 1986.

Results

Scoring leaders

Tournament awards

Pool B
Eight teams contested the second tier this year in Sapporo Japan from March 15 to 24.  It was played in a simple round robin format, each team playing seven games.

Standings

Switzerland was promoted to Pool A and France was relegated to Pool C for 1986.

Pool C
This tournament took place in Belgium from February 22 to 27. It was played in Brussels, Heist-op-den-Berg, Liège, Geel, Deurne and Antwerp.

Standings

Bulgaria was promoted to Pool B for 1986.

A. While Total Hockey lists Denmark in their standings, passionhockey.com states that this was a Netherlands team that does not count in the standings.  The IIHF encyclopedia does not include Denmark in the 1985 standings.

References

 
1985 World Junior Hockey Championships at TSN
 Results at Passionhockey.com
 

World Junior Ice Hockey Championships
World Junior Ice Hockey Championships
International ice hockey competitions hosted by Finland
December 1984 sports events in Europe
January 1985 sports events in Europe
1980s in Helsinki
International sports competitions in Turku
International sports competitions in Helsinki
1980s in Turku
Sport in Vantaa
International ice hockey competitions hosted by Japan
Sports competitions in Sapporo
20th century in Sapporo
1984–85 in Japanese ice hockey
March 1985 sports events in Europe
February 1985 sports events in Europe
1984–85 in Belgian ice hockey
1980s in Brussels
Sports competitions in Brussels
International ice hockey competitions hosted by Belgium
1980s in Antwerp
Sports competitions in Antwerp
Sport in Liège
Sport in Heist-op-den-Berg
Sport in Geel